Sir Richard Vanden-Bempde-Johnstone, 1st Baronet (21 September 1732 – 14 July 1807) was a British Member of Parliament.

Early life
Born Richard Johnstone he was the son of Colonel John Johnstone (d. 1741), second son of Sir William Johnstone, 2nd Baronet, of Westerhall. His mother was Charlotte, daughter of John van den Bempde of Hackness Hall in Hackness, near Scarborough, Yorkshire.

Career
Vanden-Bampde-Johnstone was elected to the House of Commons for Weymouth in 1790, a seat he held until 1796. On 6 July 1795 he was created a Baronet, of Hackness Hall in the North Riding of the County of York.

Personal life
In November 1756, he married Catherine Agnew, a daughter of James Agnew. After the death of his first wife in 1790, he married, secondly, Margaret Scott, daughter of John Scott, on 26 February 1795. Together, they were the parents of:

 Margaret Anne Vanden-Bempde-Johnstone (d. 1819), who married George Johnstone, son of Charles John Johnstone.
 Sir John Vanden-Bempde-Johnstone, 2nd Baronet (1799–1869), who married Louisa Augusta Venables-Vernon, daughter of Most Rev. and Rt. Hon. Edward Venables-Vernon-Harcourt and Lady Anne Leveson-Gower (a daughter of Granville Leveson-Gower, 1st Marquess of Stafford), in 1825.
 Reverend Charles Vanden-Bempde-Johnstone (1800–1882), the Canon of York who married Amelia Hawksworth, daughter of Reverend Richard Hawksworth and Isabella Pilkington, in 1827.

In 1793 he assumed by Act of Parliament his maternal grandfather's surname of Vanden-Bempde but in 1795 he was authorised by Royal licence to resume the name of Johnstone in addition to those of Vanden-Bempde.

He died in July 1807, aged 74, and was succeeded in the baronetcy by his son John. His grandson Sir Harcourt Vanden-Bempde-Johnstone, 3rd Baronet, was raised to the peerage as Baron Derwent in 1881.

See also
Johnstone Baronets of Westerhall

References

External links

www.thepeerage.com

1732 births
1807 deaths
Baronets in the Baronetage of Great Britain
Members of the Parliament of Great Britain for English constituencies
People from Hackness